Amphistemon is a genus of 2 species of flowering plants in the family Rubiaceae. It is described by Inge Groeninckx in 2010 based on a molecular analysis of the Hedyotis-Oldenlandia group. The genus name is based on the Greek 'amphi-' (=double or of two kinds) and 'stemon' (=stamen) referring to the dimorphic stamen position characteristic for this genus.

Description
Amphistemon are erect perennial herbs or subshrubs with the unique feature in the Hedyotis-Oldenlandia group of having stamens inserted at two distinct levels in the corolla tube, the lower stamens with filaments and anthers shorter than those of the upper stamens.

Distribution and habitat
It is endemic to southwestern and western Madagascar and is found in dry spiny forest-thicket and coastal bushland.

Taxonomy
According to molecular analysis of the genus, it is found to be closely related to Astiella of the species-group Hedyotis-Oldenlandia.

Species
 Amphistemon humbertii Groeninckx
 Amphistemon rakotonasolianus Groeninckx

References

External links
Amphistemon in the World Checklist of Rubiaceae

Rubiaceae genera
Spermacoceae
Endemic flora of Madagascar